McCairns is a surname. Notable people with the surname include:

Jim McCairns (1919–1948), English pilot
Tommy McCairns (1873–1932), English footballer